Since the previous elections in 2016, polling companies have published surveys tracking voting intention for the 2021 Peruvian general election. The results of these surveys are listed below in reverse chronological order. The first round of the election was held on 11 April, and the run-off between Keiko Fujimori and Pedro Castillo was held on 6 June 2021.

Analysis 
The primary candidates in Peruvian elections typically become apparent two months prior to elections. In the first wave of support, Yonhy Lescano saw initial support, though he was surpassed by Rafael López Aliaga, a far-right businessman whose speech was similar to Catholic extremism. López Aliaga's support waned following his poor debate performance, leading to neoliberal economist and advisor to Alberto Fujimori, Hernando de Soto, receiving additional support from the recently emerged middle class, though critics believed de Soto would continue Fujimori's controversial policies. 

Two weeks before the election, Keiko Fujimori, who was initially discounted due to corruption allegations and brief imprisonment, became among the most popular among poll respondents following her performance in debates. However, during the election silence period that prevented the publishing of opinion polls, Pedro Castillo saw a dramatic jump in approval, though this support was not permitted to be documented.

Presidential election (run-off)
The following graph shows the weighted polls and does not count voting simulations

Voting simulations

Electoral polls

Presidential election (first round)
The following graph shows the weighted polls, and does not include voting simulations.

Voting simulations

Electoral polls

Pre-electoral polls

Congressional election 
The following graph shows the weighted polls, and does not include voting simulations.

Voting simulations

Electoral polls

Notes

References

Elections in Peru
2021 in Peru